Sex-Business: Made in Pasing is a 1970 West German documentary film directed by Hans-Jürgen Syberberg. It focuses on Alois Brummer, a Bavarian producer of pornographic comedies and sexploitation films. The film was shot in July 1970 in Pasing, Oberaudorf. It had a budget of 30,000 DM.

The film premiered on 3 January 1970 at the Occam Studio für Filmkunst in Munich. It was broadcast on ARD on 23 March 1970. It received the Filmband in Silber, the second-place prize, for Best Documentary Feature Film at the Deutscher Filmpreis 1970. The Münchner Anstalt gave the film an honorarium of 40,000 DM.

See also
 Bavarian porn

References

External links
 

1970 films
1970 documentary films
Documentary films about pornography
Films directed by Hans-Jürgen Syberberg
Films shot in Bavaria
German documentary films
West German films
1970s German films